The Dunboyne Road Estate previously known as the Fleet Road Estate is a Grade II-listed modernist estate, designed in Gospel Oak, London by Neave Brown in the late 1960s.

Description
The scheme was designed by Neave Brown and the Camden Architects Department, it was the first application of the low-rise high-density housing scheme attached to public building. There were built in 1967, as an experiment where 71 houses, a shop, and a studio, were arranged in parallel terraced rows, in groups of eight or sixteen, following the split level principles that Brown had used in his small housing scheme in Winscombe Street. Each house had a large terrace which overlooked the communal gardens.

No 36 Dunboyne Road retains many of it original features. It is a split level two bedroomed maisonette. The sitting room and study are on the split level, with large sliding French windows leading onto a paved terrace. Details include: full storey height doors; a tiled concrete kitchen worktop with timber built in cupboards and drawers; stairs in a glazed stairwell and stairs between the split level living areas; the sliding partition between the living area and study allows the residents to configure their living space.

See also
Alexandra Road Estate

References

External links
Residents Association

Brutalist architecture in London
Grade II listed buildings in the London Borough of Camden
Housing estates in the London Borough of Camden